Dooradarshana is a 2023 Indian Kannada-language film written and directed by Sukesh Shetty, and produced by Rajesh Bhat. The film stars Pruthvi Ambaar, Ayaana,  Sundar, Veena and Harini Shreekanth, with a music score by Vasuki Vaibhav.

Cast

 Pruthvi Ambaar as Manu 
 Ayaana as Mythri 
 Sundar Veena as Ramakrishna Bhat
 Raghu Ramanakoppa as Srinivas
 Ugram Manju as Kitty
 Harini Shreekanth as Sulochanna
 Deepak Rai Panaje as Pandu
 Huli Kartik as Pradeep
 Suraj Comedy Kiladigalu as Dinesh 
 Surya Kundapur as D'Souza

Release
Dooradarshana was released on 03 March 2023 in India.

Reception
Vijaya Karnataka gave  3.5 out of 5 and wrote "The film talks about TV days people who lived around the '90s this movie is guaranteed to relive the excitement and desires of the wonder of TV in their hometowns."

References

External links

2023 films
Films set in Karnataka
Films shot in Karnataka
Indian drama films